Shankar Hari Godbole (1885–1972) was an artist who excelled in watercolour medium, portraits, landscapes and scenes of rural India. As the secretary of the Pune branch of the Bombay Art Society he organised the annual ‘Monsoon Art Exhibitions’ in Pune. His art was collected by English civil servants and army officers of colonial British India. He is the maternal grandfather of Artist Mumbiram.

Early life

Shankar Hari Godbole was born around 1885 in Wai in Maharashtra. Wai was an important religious center on the bank of the Krishna river. Godbole's ancestors worked in traditional priestly occupations, and were well-versed in the Vedas. Godbole's father was Hari Ganesh Godbole. His scholarly works ‘Aatmavidyaa’ and ‘Jeevitavidyaa’ remain popular today. Hari Ganesh Godbole educated himself in the British colonial education system and became the headmaster of government high schools in Pune, Nasik. 
S.H.Godbole was married as a teenager to Varanasi Vartak, the eldest daughter of Vishnu Vartak, chief engineer of the Bombay Presidency. From this marriage, Godbole had four artistically gifted daughters. Varanasi died of tuberculosis around 1935.  Godbole married a second time around 1940. His second wife was a widow who was introduced to him by the social reformer Dhondo Keshav Karve. From this marriage he had one son.

Artistic path

Art Teacher at St. Vincent High School and Secretary at the Bombay Art Society of Pune

Godbole joined Mumbai's Sir Jamsetjee Jeejeebhoy School of Art against the wishes of his parents around 1910. There he befriended Narayan Eranna Puram and the two became lifelong friends. Both of them dropped out of J.J. School to follow independent paths. Godbole became a teacher in St. Vincent's High School in Pune's army cantonment area. His watercolour paintings found many admirers among the English and Parsee communities of Pune.
 
In the 1930s, Godbole became the secretary of the Pune branch of the Bombay Art Society. In that capacity he organised the annual Monsoon exhibitions of the Bombay Art Society under the patronage of the governor of the Bombay presidency. Contemporaries have reminisced about the pomp and circumstances of the grand opening ceremony of the exhibition in which the governor was the chief guest. Godbole never entered any of his own works in these exhibitions.

Institute of Modern Art
Puram and Godbole founded the “Institute of Modern Art” in Pune in the 1930s. This later evolved into Puram's “Bharatiya Kala Prasarini Sabha”, the parent body of Pune's first art and architecture college, Abhinav Kala Vidyalaya. For many years Godbole's son-in-law, Ramdas Paranjpe, was a member of the executive committee of the Sabha. Along with Sayajirao Silam, Ramdas Paranjpe contributed to the fund-raising activities of the institute. Later in the 1960s Ramdas Paranjpe became the president of the Bharatiya Kala Prasarini Sabha. Ramdas Paranjpe was an admirer of Godbole and his work.

Early works
The painting of "Young Men with Ganesha on Ocean Beach" is an idealised version of a Ganapati Visarjan procession. This is one of several renditions on this theme Godbole made in the 1930s. It is unlike any procession that has taken place in Pune or Mumbai at any time in the last 100 years. This is Godbole's own vision that he obviously cherished very much. There is no pretense at showing anatomical accuracy or virtuosity of technique. Yet the artist is successful in communicating his vision of an intimate emotional experience. The painting is reminiscent of early Bengal School of Art such as Kshitindranath Majumdar, Jamini Roy and even some early Rabindranath Tagore paintings. Another unorthodox feature about this painting is the androgynous quality that the bodies and souls of these Ganesha devotees exude.

Life on Idyllic Farmhouse
After retirement around 1942, Godbole established his art studio in a farm house on the outskirts of Pune on the Puna Bombay road. There he created an idyllic atmosphere and continued to make watercolour masterpieces. His grandson, Mumbiram, described the romantic atmosphere that prevailed in that farm house art studio. Mumbiram wholeheartedly credits Godbole for the early influences and training that he received. Godbole was famous for painting Indian rural scenes. Many of them involved bullock carts a favorite theme of his paintings in the 1940s.

An example for this period of his life is the painting "Bullock Cart Caravan returning home at sundown" which Godbole made when he was residing at his farm house. Godbole developed an impressionistic hands-on approach. Through blobs of the brush an impression is created.

Indian movie maker K. Narayan Kale had hung this painting on top of his bed in his house in Pune.

Last years
Much of Godbole's work was damaged during the great floods that inundated Pune when the Panshet and Khadakwasla Dams broke in July 1961. Godbole's daughter Anjani and grandson Mumbiram salvaged and restored some of his great body of works. In the second half of the 20th century Indian art came under the western influence of abstraction and distortion lead by the Bombay Progressive Artists' Group. Classical art was relegated to oblivion. Artist Godbole's last years were spent in indebtedness. He was forced to sell his farm house. He died in 1972 unknown to the art world.

Art works

Unique interpretation of mythological themes
In the 1930s, Godbole was experimenting with a fusion of Indian mythological themes depicted in a western classical painting style. This was also the period when his friend Puram was creating illustrations for the monumental Mahabharata edition created by the Bhandarkar Oriental Research Institute of Pune.

A rare surviving example of that period is “Ravana’s encounter with Sita in Panchavati” a painting based on the defining moment of the epic Ramayana. Godbole's depiction of Ravana's encounter with Sita is entirely different from traditional understanding of that meeting. 
The clever Ravana is seen approaching Sita neither as a sanyasi to be respected nor as a fearful demon who can scarcely disguise his real self. Ravana is seen here as a youthful, courteous, even likable wanderer of the forest. Ravana seems to have an acute understanding of the mental state of an overprotected young women approached by an exotic stranger with unclear intentions. This depiction seems to suggest that Ravana lured Sita to cross the Laxmana Rekha rather than blackmailing her. Godbole has given this a unique interpretation that depicts Ravana as a charming young man and Sita as an innocent beautiful girl. It's indeed a very unusual display of the much adored and celebrated Sita typically shown as a demi-goddess as in many other depictions. 
Clearly this interpretation comes out of a deep understanding of the cleverness of Ravana as well as the out-of-character, all-too-human sentiments exhibited by Sita that disrupted the idyllic life that Rama and Sita were living in Panchavati. This also set the stage for the ultimate confrontation of all-out war between Rama and Ravana that led to the annihilation of Ravana, along with his invincible Lanka.

Master of watercolor
Godbole created a transparent feeling in his portraits and landscapes in watercolor paintings, both portraits. Mumbiram has described this treatment of watercolors as "Highlights and bright areas are created by leaving the paper white or let it shine through, rather than by adding white pigment to the colors. The artist has to have a good judgment of the light effects before dipping the brush in the colours."

The painting "Midday Feast for the Village Deity in the Forest" is a rendering made around 1950 when the artist was at the height of his creative genius. Most of Godbole's landscapes are given context by the people who populate them.

The vibrant “still life” of “Antique Japanese Vase" was produced by Godbole around 1950. He had no connection with the Bombay Art Society which he once steered under the close patronage of the governor of Bombay Presidency. In the name of modernity Indian artists were coming under increasing influence of “western” art movements of the first half of 20th century. Godbole was now a free man with no pressing need to align with any movement or any society. He was 65 and had the experience of a life time with his favorite medium: watercolor.

References 

1885 births
1972 deaths
20th-century Indian painters
Indian male painters
Indian art educators
19th-century Indian painters
19th-century Indian male artists
20th-century Indian male artists